The Dieringhausen Railway Museum (Eisenbahnmuseum Dieringhausen) is a railway history museum in Dieringhausen in the district of Oberbergischer Kreis in North Rhine-Westphalia, Germany.

After railway operations had ceased on 1 May 1982, a society was founded with the aim of forming and running a museum. That same year the first museum festival was celebrated.

Installations 
The site has a historical locomotive roundhouse with twelve roads and their associated turntable. Even the equipment of the former steam depot can be seen. A cafeteria and bookshop have been established for visitors.

The museum has a fleet of eleven steam locomotives, eleven diesel locomotives, four electric locomotives and a collection of railway wagons.
In early 2007 the DRB Class 52 tender locomotive, 8095, was sold to the Vulkan-Eifel-Bahn Betriebsgesellschaft mbH, based at Gerolstein.
A planned sale of the DRB Class 50 goods train steam locomotive, number 3610-8, fell through. So it was hired to the DRWI (see below) until its inspection licence ran out in December 2007.

The Prussian P 8 steam engine P8 2455 "Posen" from the firm of "Länderbahnreisen / Manuel Jußen", Marburg, is also stationed at Dieringhausen.

The DRWI (Dampfbahn Rur-Wurm-Inde), formerly based at the museum, left in early 2007 with several wagons and the steam locomotive 52 8148. Its new home is in Mönchengladbach.

References

External links 
  
 Website of the Prussian P8 2455 Posen*
 English website of the 'Society For The Preservation Of The Wiehltalbahn'

Railway museums in Germany
Heritage railways in Germany
Transport in North Rhine-Westphalia
Museums in North Rhine-Westphalia